Julián Hernández (born 1972 in Mexico City, Mexico as Julián Hernández Pérez) is a Mexican multi-awarded  filmmaker. He won twice the Teddy Award at Berlin Film Festival with his movies Thousand Clouds of Peace Fence the Sky, Love, Your Being Love Will Never End (2003), and Raging Sun, Raging Sky (2009). He studied at the Centro Universitario de Estudios Cinematográficos (CUEC), from where he was expelled due to his gay-themed films during a homophobic administration, and was not mentioned as a serious director until he started winning international recognition. He has credited his use of cinematographic language to influences from filmmakers such as Michelangelo Antonioni, Leonardo Favio, Robert Bresson, and Alain Resnais. Hernández has directed more than 20 awarded short films (both documentaries and fictional), and became a gay-cinema icon for his feature films, including Broken Sky. Along with producer and director Roberto Fiesco, he founded Cooperativa Cinematográfica Morelos. which later became the prestigious  production company Mil Nubes Cine, producing 29 films over two decades.

Filmography 
Hernández's movies are known for his approach to the cinematographic language in which he pays special attention to aesthetics. Many critics have compared his work with choreographies and praise his use of sequence shots.

Awards

Notes

References

External links 
 

1972 births
Mexican screenwriters
Living people
People from Mexico City
Mexican film directors
Mexican film editors
Mexican film producers